The Virginia Cavaliers women's soccer team represents University of Virginia in the Atlantic Coast Conference (ACC) of NCAA Division I women's college soccer. The team has won three regular season conference championships, in 2013, 2015 and 2021. The Cavaliers have also won the ACC Women's Soccer Tournament twice, in 2004 and 2012. The team has advanced to the NCAA Women's soccer tournament thirty three times. Their best appearance is runner up in 2014.

History

1980s
The Virginia Cavaliers women's soccer team was founded in 1985 with head coach Dan Beshoar.  The team went 10–8–0 in their inaugural season and did not play in a conference.  The University of Virginia was a member of the Atlantic Coast Conference, but the conference did not begin to sponsor women's soccer until 1987.  Beshoar would only coach one season and Lauren Gregg would take over in 1986. In her first season, the Cavaliers finished with their only non-winning record in program history.  An 8–8–2 record was still .500, however.  In 1987 the team made its first NCAA Women's soccer tournament, falling in the first round.  1988 was the inaugural season of the ACC Women's Soccer Tournament.  The Cavaliers qualified, and fell in the first round.  However, they made it all the way to the Sweet 16 in the NCAA Tournament.  The decade closed with repeat performances in both the ACC and NCAA tournaments, but and improvement to 16 overall wins, from 14 in the previous season.

1990s
Gregg's successful run continued into the 90s, as the Cavaliers began the decade with an 18 win season, finished runners up in the ACC Tournament, and made the Sweet 16 of the NCAA Tournament.  Their 18–3–0 record was a program best for wins that would stand until 2013.  The Cavaliers had continued success in 1991 as they made the semifinals of the NCAA Tournament.  1993 proved to be a difficult season, in relative terms, for the team.  Their 10–9–2 record was the second worst by winning percentage in team history.  It was also only the third time in the team's history they did not qualify for the NCAA Tournament.  The Cavaliers would turn it around quickly however, finishing 1994 with 4 conference wins, 13 overall wins, and a return to the NCAA Tournament.  1994 was the start of a string of 25 straight NCAA appearances for the team.  After a very similar 1995 season, Gregg would retire as head coach.  Prior to the 1996 season, it was announced that April Heinrichs would be the third coach in program history.  Heinrichs continued the team's success, winning double digit overall games in each year between 1996 and 1999.  The Cavailers also qualified for both the NCAA Tournament and ACC Tournament in those seasons.  A new team record of 5 ACC wins was set in 1998.  The team also made the NCAA Sweet 16 in 1997 and 1999.  After the 1999 season, Heinrichs left Virginia to become the coach of the US Women's National Team.

2000s
The decade began with the hiring of Steve Swanson as the program's fourth head coach in history. The hiring would prove a transformative one, but Swanson got off to a slow start.  In 2000, the team won only 11 overall games, their lowest total since 1993.  However, the team did make it to the NCAA Sweet 16 for the second year in a row.  2001 proved successful with 17 total wins and a trip to the NCAA Quarterfinals.  2002 saw a lower win total of 13, but the team returned to the NCAA Round of 16.  2003 would end a run of four straight years making the NCAA Round of 16.  The Cavaliers lost in the second round of the NCAA Tournament and won 12 games overall.  In 2004, the team won their first ever ACC Tournament Championship.  This post-season luck did not carry forward to the NCAA Tournament, where they lost in the second round.  The team tied a then-program best win total of 18 in 2005, finished runners up in the ACC Tournament and returned to the Quarterfinals of the NCAA Tournament.  The 2005 season began a run of 14 straight season where the Cavaliers made at least the NCAA Round of 16.  However, ACC Tournament success would not follow, as the team never made it past the second round from 2006 to 2011.  The team closed the decade with a 10 win season in 2009.

2010s
The Cavaliers won an increasing number of games each year between 2010 and 2013.  This improvement streak began with a solid 15 wins, and 7 conference wins in 2000.  Additionally, the Cavaliers extended their streak of making at least the NCAA Round of 16.  2011 would be the team's fourth ever NCAA Quarterfinals appearance.  2012 saw the Cavaliers win their second ACC Tournament, tie their program record for overall wins at 18, and make the NCAA Sweet 16.  2013 and 2014 would be the two best years in program history.  In 2013, the Cavaliers had a perfect ACC season, finishing 13–0–0 and winning the regular season title.  They would also make the NCAA Semifinals for the first time in since 1991.  In 2014, they finished runners up in both the ACC and NCAA Tournaments.  To follow that up, they again finished runners up in the ACC Tournament in 2015.  However, they fell one win short of a third straight year of 20 overall wins.  The program could not quite repeat those highs from 2016 to 2018.  However, the team did finish with double digit wins and NCAA Sweet 16 appearances in each of those seasons.

2020s 
The decade started with a season shortened by the COVID-19 pandemic.  The team played a reduced conference schedule in the fall and played their out of conference schedule in the spring of 2021.  They finished in third place in the ACC with a 5–2–1 record.  The NCAA tournament was held in the spring, and the Cavaliers advanced to the Semifinals, before falling on penalties.  This was their best performance in the NCAA tournament since 2014.  2021 saw a return to a more normal schedule and the Cavaliers posted a 18–3–2 overall record and a 8–0–2 ACC record.  They won the ACC Regular Season title and received an at-large bid to the NCAA Tournament.  They were unable to match last year's semifinal performance, falling in the Round of 16.  2022 was another successful year with the Cavaliers posting 16 wins and finishing fourth in the ACC.  They qualified for the NCAA Tournament for the twenty-ninth time in a row and reached the Quarterfinals before losing to the eventual champion, UCLA.

Personnel

Current roster

Team management

Source:

Seasons

Notable alumni

Current Professionals 

  Becky Sauerbrunn (2003–2007) – Currently with Portland Thorns and USA international
  Morgan Gautrat (2011–2014) – Currently with Kansas City Current and USA international
  Danielle Colaprico (2011–2014) – Currently with San Diego Wave
  Makenzy Doniak (2012–2015) – Currently with San Diego Wave
  Brittany Ratcliffe (2012–2015) – Currently with North Carolina Courage
  Emily Sonnett (2012–2015) – Currently with Washington Spirit and USA international
  Kristen McNabb (2012–2016) – Currently with San Diego Wave
  Veronica Latsko (2014–2017) – Currently with OL Reign
  Megan Reid (2014–2017) – Currently with Angel City
  Brianna Westrup (2015–2018) – Currently with Sunderland and Scotland international
  Courtney Petersen (2015–2019) – Currently with Orlando Pride
  Phoebe McClernon (2016–2019) – Currently with OL Reign
  Zoe Morse (2016–2019) – Currently with Chicago Red Stars
  Diana Ordoñez (2019–2021) – Currently with North Carolina Courage and Mexico international

References

External links

 

 
Soccer clubs in Virginia
NCAA Division I women's soccer teams